Peach Blossom Debt (Chinese: 桃花债) is a danmei fictional novel written by Da-Feng-Gua-Guo (Chinese: 大风刮过). It was first serialized on Jinjiang (http://www.jjwxc.net/) from January 2007 to August 2007 and first published by Uei-Shiang Co., Ltd. in Taiwan. Its simplified Chinese version was later published by China Federation of Literary and Art Circles Publishing Corporation in July 2016. It was translated into Thai and published in Thailand in December 2016.

The storyline is Song Yao's long journey through transmigrations, to and fro between immortal and mortal world. The fiction depicts the struggling of several main characters and their entangled destinations (their “debts” to each other) and finally comes to a happy end.

Translation of the Title
桃花债 can be directly translated as Peach Blossom Debt. The sense-for-sense translation could be Romance of Love Debt, since peach blossoms are used as a symbol of love in Chinese culture.

World Setting
The world setting of this fiction is based on Chinese local mythology, Taoist culture and Buddhist culture: There are 3 worlds: mortal world of human beings, Heavenly Palace of the immortals (The immortals mainly origin from Taoism) and Western Paradise of Buddhas. Mortal human beings and animals can become immortal by practice Taosiam or Buddhism or, like Song Yao, by taking the elixir pills. Immortals and Buddhas can visit each other in Heavenly Palace and Western Paradise. The souls of both the immortals and the mortals can go through transmigrations or samsara. The immortals' transmigrating as a mortal is a part of their practice or a way to pay the karma/debt for what they have done before.

Main Characters and terminologies (With Chinese)
Immortal Song Yao (Chinese 宋珧元君): The leading character and narrator of this story. He used to be mortal but becomes immortal after he takes an elixir pill unknowingly. His Celestial Title is Guangxu (Chinese广虚, means “Infinite Void”)

Pure Immortal Hengwen (Chinese衡文清君): The god of knowledge and talent. His Celestial Title is Hengwen, meaning “Judging one’s knowledge and talent according to his/her literature works”. He asks Song Yao to give him a name of a mortal, Zhao Heng (Chinese 赵衡). Zhao and Song are both the name of ancient Chinese vassal states. Coincidentally, Zhao is also the surname of Empires of Song Dynasty.

Stellar Immortal Tianshu (Chinese 天枢星君): The god of mortal emperors. Tianshu (Chinese 天枢) is the ancient name of Dubhe, the brightest star of Plough. In Chinese classic literature, Dubhe is the metaphor for the virtue of an emperor.

Imperial Immortal Nanming (Chinese 南明帝君): The god of the fortune of mortal empires Nanming (Chinese 南明) is the alias of a Chinese constellation and/or mythological animal Vermilion Bird (Chinese 朱雀).

Stellar Immortal Taibai (Chinese 太白星君): Taibai is the Chinese name for Venus, the morning star and the star of the West in Chinese Culture. Traditional Chinese astrology believes Venus is linked with war and the overthrow of emperors. However, in many Chinese fantasy fictions (including this one), He is usually described as an old servant and messenger of Jade Emperor.

Jade Emperor (Chinese 玉帝): The ruler of the immortal word Heavenly Palace (Chinese 天庭). He is a deity of Taoism. His image is basically an immortal version of an ancient emperor of China

Queen Mother of the West (Chinese: 王母娘娘, 西王母): The co-ruler of Heavenly Place. She is a deity of Taoism and usually described as a beautiful lady who is in charge of a magical peach orchard of immortality.

Ancient Deity of Grand Supreme (Chinese: 太上老君): A powerful deity in Heavenly Palace. He is a deity of Taoism whose prototype is Laozi. His elixir pills can make mortal human immortal and cure immortals of losing immortal power and severe injury

Stellar Immortal Destiny (Chinese: 命格星君): The god of the destination of the mortals.  He has a notebook which whatever written in will happen to the mortals later

Heavenly Palace (Chinese 天庭): In Chinese mythology, the majority of deities live in Heavenly Palace. It is like a Chinese version of Mount Olympus

The Execution Tower (Chinese 诛仙台): Deities and immortals who are found guilty will jump from the Execution Tower as a punishment. They will become mortal and even their souls will vanish.

Celestial Title (Chinese:虚号): A title given to an immortal or deity in the Heavenly Palace.

External links
 豆瓣读书 桃花债
 晋江文学城 桃花债
 GoodReads The Peach Blossom Debt

2007 Chinese novels
2016 Chinese novels